Cornel Mihai Ungureanu (born December 6, 1965) is a Romanian novelist and journalist.

Born in Craiova, he graduated Spiru Haret University, Psychology Studies.
Member of Uniunea Scriitorilor, Writers' Union of Romania, from 2004.
Magazine contributions: Dilema, Mozaicul, Ramuri, Vatra, SpectActor, Familia, Tomis, Argeș, Timpul, Viața Românească, Respiro, LiterNet.

Works

First article published in Dilema magazine, 1999.

First short story published in literature magazine Ramuri, 1999.

Prose
Treptele din fața casei (publicistică, 2002, editura LiterNet)
Pașii șarpelui (novel, Editura Timpul, 2003)
"Cornel Mihai Ungureanu turns indeed to the daily life brimming with stories, to the non-fictionalized life, saved from banality by visions of miraculous universes.
The world in The Steps of the Snake is a retro one, of town-dwellers who return – even if only for the holiday – to the countryside, where they find the savor of stories "from other times", told by witty, wise old men. The dialogs flow naturally, without any false chords, the novelist knows how to observe the oral quality of the speech, the colloquial ambiguities, the meanings hidden in unfinished sentences."
(Bianca Burta, Observator cultural nr. 171/2003)

Un fluture albastru (short stories, Editura Ramuri, 2003)
"(...) the excellent book by Cornel Mihai Ungureanu, A Blue Butterfly (Ramuri Publishing House), that affects the same "here and now" realism, touching, by its straightforward manner and by the chosen topics, a journalistic style, to reach the realm of decisive questions, treated with slight doubt and heavy irony."

"A Blue Butterfly is what it was programmed to be, the official inaugural moment of the relationship between the author and his audience. A good part of the nuclei that define his world are taking shape now: the familial as relationship with The Other (a whole army of aunts and grandmothers, brothers, sisters), the young couples, the kisses that have an almost haunting weight in the show that is observed and narrated, the paradoxical desire to be what he wants and doesn't believe that he is, namely a writer, but also the acquired reflexes that will come to characterize his style: a propensity for what Bogdan Suceava is calling, in his preface to this book, 'fissures' of reality."
(Xenia Karo, Vatra, nr. 5/2006)

Noi, doi-trei la zece mii (novel, Editura Ramuri, 2005)
"We, Two or Three in Every Ten Thousand is a collection of narrative sequences, ingeniously connected to a tyrannical super-theme: an attempt to negotiate the auctorial rapport between the internal and external realms. (...)
From the alert dialogic option, much more obvious here, we deduce, this time, a much more daring attitude, so that, for instance, the temptations of lyrism, followed obediently in the previous books, are now kept only as springboards for irony and sarcasm. (...)
Accomplished writing becomes a character in itself, the motive-character, the wonderful being kidnapped by the obscure forces of the unconscious. We are reading a book about waiting as hunting for a peak, about waiting for fulfillment, about how to wait and what could be done while waiting. (...)
The auctorial option seems to go towards the availabilities of the feminine agent, present in all its shades: the maternal impact, the protective-sisterly, the amorously ungrateful, capricious, delicate, spiritual (or not) feminine figures. The alibi of looking for a partner able to wait for him while he is weaving stories operates as a parable for seeking the tone of the book, in such a way that the sought-after femininity becomes both writing and flesh-and-blood beloved woman. What is invariable is the role assumed by femininity, in the splendor of all its types, that of a catalyst in sketching and feeding the auctorial cocoon."
(Xenia Karo, Vatra, nr. 5/2006)

Recreații cu Babi (publicistică, Editura Brumar, 2008)

Literary prizes
Petre Pandrea Prize for Literature of Mozaicul Magazine (2003)
Book of the Year 2005" of Uniunea Scriitorilor – Craiova, for "Noi, doi-trei la zece mii" (2005)
Nominee for Romanian Club of Press Prize – section Editorial  (2008)

External links

 www.cornelmihaiungureanu.ro
 www.uniuneascriitorilor.ro

 Cornel Mihai Ungureanu
 Dao tao SEO

References 

21st-century Romanian novelists
Living people
1965 births
Romanian male novelists